= Mayor Duterte =

Mayor Duterte may refer to:

- Rodrigo Duterte, mayor of Dávao (1988–1998, 2013–2016)
- Sara Duterte, mayor of Dávao, (2010–2013, 2016–2019)
